The Nami Island International Picture Book Illustration Concours, (Nami Concours), is an international competition held in Korea for children's book artists. The biannual event is sponsored by Nami Island, Korea, and seeks to encourage artistic creativity and advance the quality of picture book illustrations worldwide.

The competition is open to all picture book illustrators and was launched in 2013.

Objectives
In 2013, Nami Concours was added to an existing children's book program NAMBOOK. The Nami Concours was launched for the wider purpose than NAMBOOK, to offer wider opportunities to illustrators from all over the world, who love children's books .

History
The first Nami Concours was held in 2013. It celebrated the opportunity to elevate the level of creativity required in children's picture books. Picture book illustration is a unique art form. The competition helps to heighten the awareness surrounding the high caliber of art required to create outstanding children's books.

Contest Requirements
Illustrations may be in print or digital format
Each set of illustrations needs to comprise one story
Each applicant can upload 5-10 images per entry
The size of each image may differ as long as the total sum is less than 20MB
Each work should be at least 1024 pixels
Each applicant may submit up to three different entries
Applicants must submit a 100-work synopsis for each entry

Prizes
Grand Prix (1 prize) Plaque and US$10,000
Golden Island (2 prizes) Plaque and US$5000
Green Island (5 prizes) Plaque and US$2000
Purple Island (10 prizes) Certificate and plaque

3rd Nami Concours (2017)
A total of 1,777 entries from 89 nations were submitted. A shortlist of 150 illustrators from 43 nations was announced in November 2016. The winners were announced in February 2017 and are listed below.

Grand Prix
 Malgorzata Gurowska (Poland)
Golden Island
 Anna Morgunova (Russia)
 JooHee Yoon (USA)
Green Island
 Myung-ae Lee (Korea)
 Ksenia Rodkina (Russia)
 Amir Shabanjpour (Iran)
 Catarina Sobral (Portugal)
 Albertine Zullo (Switzerland)
Purple Island
 Luca Di Battista (Italy)
 Marilda Castanha (Brazil)
 Julien Cheng (Canada)
 Hye-jin Kim (Korea)
 Ji-min Kim (Korea)
 Yara Kono (Portugal)
 Svetlana Makhrova (Russia)
 Britta Teckentrup (Germany)
 Rong Yu (UK)
 Zou-Chao Zuo (China)

2nd Nami Concours (2015)
A total of 1,330 entries were submitted from 71 nations. A video of the Nami Concours 2015 was made, including the winning and shortlisted works.

Grand Prix
 Marcelo Pimentel (Brazil)
Golden Island
 Sonja Danowski (Germany)
 Torben Kuhlmann (Germany)
Green Island
 Hassan Amekan (Iran)
 Julie Bernard (Reunion)
 Myeongae Lee (South Korea)
Purple Island
Awang Fadilah Ali Hussein (Malaysia)
Manon Gauthier (illustrator) (Canada)
Maya Hanisch (Chile)
Mi Jung Lee (illustrator) (South Korea)
Anna Morgunova (Russia)
Urszula Palusinska (Poland)
Andreja Peklar (Slovenia)
David Pintor (Spain)
Tatiana Sugachkova (Russia)
Margarita Surnaite (Lithuania)

1st Nami Concours (2013)
A total of 619 entries were submitted from 42 nations. A video of the Nami Concours 2013 was made, including the winning works.

Grand Prix
Sung-hee Kim (South Korea)
Golden Island
Sonja Danowski (Germany)
Nooshin Safakhoo (Iran)
Green Island
Claudia Legnazzi (Argentina)
Anna Morgunova (Russia)
Gyu-taek Kim (South Korea)
Sang-woo Chae (South Korea)
Jainal Amambing (Malaysia)
Special Prize
Salah Kamal Eldin Mohammed (Sudan)
David Pintor (Spain)
Rashin Kheiriyeh (Iran)
Irma Gruenholz (Spain)
Nazli Tahvili (Iran)
Eva Montanari (Italy)
Seul-gi Kim (South Korea)
Iris Daeun (USA)
Katarzyna Bogucka (Poland)
Masha Manapov (Israel)
Encouragement Prize
Yu Pianyi (China)
Maral Sassouni (France)
Kamilla Wicttmann (Denmark)
Ju-mi Lee (Australia)
Ann James (Australia)
Hye-young Kim (South Korea)
Reza Dalvand (Iran)
Lucie Dvořáková (Czech)
Diana Margareta Cepleanu (Romania)
Eun-mi Kim (South Korea)
Rasa Zmuidiene (Lithuania)

References

Illustrated book awards
International competitions